Tetyana Apaycheva (née Khamitova, Divorced Samolenko and Dorovskykh, born 12 August 1961) is a Ukrainian retired middle-distance runner who represented the Soviet Union until 1991, the Unified Team in 1992, and later Ukraine. She is the 1988 Olympic champion in the 3000 metres.

Career
As Tetyana Samolenko, she was the leading female middle-distance runner of the late 1980s. She is the 1988 Olympic champion at 3000 metres, the 1987 World champion at both 1500 metres and 3000 metres, and the 1987 World Indoor champion at 3000 metres. At 1500m, she also won Olympic bronze (1988), World Indoor silver (1987), European silver (1986) and the 1986 Goodwill Games title. Having given birth in 1990, she returned to competition in 1991 competing as Tetyana Dorovskikh, and retained her World title at 3000 metres, as well winning a silver medal in the 1500 metres final behind Hassiba Boulmerka. Her last major competition was the 1992 Olympic Games, where she won a silver medal in the 3000 metres and finished fourth in the 1500 metres final.

Her previous performances were somewhat soured when she tested positive for drug use in June 1993, which effectively brought an end to her career.

Personal life
She was born in a village called Sekretarka in Severny District, Orenburg Oblast, Russia, and grew up in Zaporizhzhia, Ukraine. Her second husband was the race walker Viktor Dorovskikh. Her third husband is the former Olympic decathlete Oleksandr Apaychev.

Personal bests
800 metres - 1:58.56 - Donetsk 1985
1500 metres - 3:57.92 - Barcelona 1992
3000 metres - 8:26.53 - Seoul 1988

International competitions

References

1961 births
Living people
People from Severny District, Orenburg Oblast
Soviet female middle-distance runners
Ukrainian female middle-distance runners
Olympic athletes of the Soviet Union
Olympic gold medalists for the Soviet Union
Olympic bronze medalists for the Soviet Union
Athletes (track and field) at the 1988 Summer Olympics
Athletes (track and field) at the 1992 Summer Olympics
World Athletics Championships athletes for the Soviet Union
World Athletics Championships medalists
European Athletics Championships medalists
Doping cases in athletics
Ukrainian sportspeople in doping cases
Soviet sportspeople in doping cases
Honoured Masters of Sport of the USSR
Recipients of the Order of Princess Olga, 3rd class
Ukrainian people of Russian descent
Medalists at the 1992 Summer Olympics
Medalists at the 1988 Summer Olympics
Olympic silver medalists for the Unified Team
Olympic gold medalists in athletics (track and field)
Olympic silver medalists in athletics (track and field)
Olympic bronze medalists in athletics (track and field)
Goodwill Games medalists in athletics
Soviet Athletics Championships winners
World Athletics Indoor Championships medalists
World Athletics Indoor Championships winners
World Athletics Championships winners
Competitors at the 1986 Goodwill Games